Skeleton Creek is a 2009 children's horror mystery novel by Patrick Carman, the first of a continuing series. The second is Ghost in the Machine (published in 2009), the third is The Crossbones (published in 2010), the fourth is The Raven (published in 2011), and the fifth is The Phantom Room (published in 2014).

Synopsis
The story takes place in a small town called Skeleton Creek, that was formerly a gold and silver mining town. It is haunted by the ghost of "Old Joe Bush", a man who died in an accident on The Dredge, a large mining machine. Two youths in the town, Ryan McCray and Sarah Fincher, attempt to investigate the dredge and its ghost, while being closely watched by their parents and Ranger Bonner who are trying to keep the two separated after Ryan breaks his leg on the Dredge which leads to Sarah and Ryan not being able to communicate with each other at all. A video series, starring Sarah, also goes along with the novel, which shows trips to the Dredge and ghost sightings such as Old Joe Bush

Pre-release
Prior to the release of Skeleton Creek, a conspiracy website (SkeletonCreekIsReal.com) was created, questioning whether the videos and journal entries were actual events. The basis of the website is that the creator found a hidden directory on Patrick Carman's website. On the directory were files of videos. The creator uses these videos to determine that the events in Skeleton Creek happened in the real town of Sumpter, Oregon. The site has a blog where the creator talks about findings, and videos where he posts things such as the videos he finds on Patrick Carman's website, analysis of those videos, a trip to the Dredge and promotion for The Raven, the fourth book in the series. As of August 13, 2011, no blog entries have been made, and the last video was posted November 1, 2010. Even though it is considered abandoned, updates to the site are made, such as new advertisements for Patrick Carman's other projects. Patrick Carman has admitted to creating the website to promote the book and its sequels. One of these websites is called Sarahfincher.com. It accompanies the book. It is filled with videos that may be spooky for young children. To watch a video you must have reached a point in the book that has a password. Many of the password contains gibberish making the passwords hard to guess. The videos are made, looking like they are only made for Ryan, and many people enjoy playing along.

Awards
 2011 New Mexico Land of Enchantment
 Short List
 2011: Skeleton Creek
 Children's Book Council nominee
 2010: The Crossbones
 Pennsylvania Young Reader's Choice Awards
 2010–2011: Skeleton Creek
 Delaware Diamonds Booklist
 2010–2011: Skeleton Creek
 Oregon Battle of the Books List
 2010–2011: Skeleton Creek

References
 Skeleton Creek official website
 Sarah Fincher videos that accompany the novel
 From the author, Patrick Carman

Notes

2009 American novels
American children's novels
Children's mystery novels
Ghost novels
2009 children's books